Kelly Simone Talavou (born October 4, 1984) is a former American football defensive tackle. He was originally signed by the Atlanta Falcons as an undrafted free agent in 2007, and has also been a member of the Seattle Seahawks and Baltimore Ravens.

Talavou played his junior and senior season college football at Utah, where he transferred from the University of Idaho in 2004. He lettered in his freshman and sophomore season with the Vandals. He spent his senior year in high school at Fountain Valley High School, where he was a two-way starter.

External links
Baltimore Ravens bio
Utah Utes bio

1984 births
Living people
Sportspeople from Santa Ana, California
American football defensive tackles
Idaho Vandals football players
Utah Utes football players
Atlanta Falcons players
Seattle Seahawks players
Baltimore Ravens players
Players of American football from California
American sportspeople of Samoan descent